The bull skink, southern sand-skink or heath skink (Liopholis multiscutata) is a species of skink, a lizard in the family Scincidae. The species is endemic to southern Australia.

References

Skinks of Australia
Liopholis
Reptiles described in 1949
Taxa named by Francis John Mitchell